Thalia Myers (born in the West of England in 1945) is a British concert pianist, teacher and animateur.

Her solo recordings include six albums of contemporary works, as well as music by Haydn and Chopin. She is the initiator of the highly successful Spectrum anthologies, published by the ABRSM, and the Chamber Music Exchange.

References

 "Thalia Myers Profile", Royal College of Music, Junior Department

External links
 
 "Thalia Myers releases", iTunes
 "Thalia Myers 'radio'", Last.fm

1945 births
Living people
British classical pianists
British women pianists
Date of birth missing (living people)
21st-century classical pianists
21st-century women pianists